Scott Philip Brown (born September 12, 1959) is an American diplomat, attorney, and politician who served as the United States Ambassador to New Zealand and Samoa. He is a former United States Senator for Massachusetts (2010–2013), and also was the 2014 Republican nominee for the U.S. Senate in New Hampshire. Before his Senate tenure, Brown served as a member of the Massachusetts General Court, first in the State House of Representatives (1998–2004) and then in the State Senate (2004–2010).

In 2010, Brown faced Democratic candidate Massachusetts Attorney General Martha Coakley in a special election which occurred after the 2009 death of longtime Senator Ted Kennedy. While initially trailing Coakley by a large margin, Brown saw a sudden late surge and posted a come-from-behind win to become the first Republican elected to the U.S. Senate from Massachusetts since Edward Brooke in 1972. Brown ran for a full Senate term in 2012, but lost to Democratic challenger Elizabeth Warren. After his defeat, Brown subsequently joined the board of directors of Kadant paper company, joined Fox News as a commentator, and joined Nixon Peabody where he provided legal services.

After re-establishing residence in New Hampshire, Brown then campaigned for the U.S. Senate from New Hampshire in the 2014 elections. Brown won the Republican nomination by a significant margin, but was defeated by incumbent Democrat Jeanne Shaheen in the general election. On April 20, 2017, it was reported that Brown had been nominated by President Donald Trump to be the next United States Ambassador to New Zealand and Samoa. He was confirmed by the Senate as Ambassador to New Zealand on June 8, 2017 and arrived in New Zealand on June 25.

From January to August 2021, Brown served as dean of New England Law Boston, a private law school located in downtown Boston. In April 2022, Brown became head of The Competitiveness Coalition, a newly formed conservative coalition group.

Early life and education (1959–1978)
Brown is of English ancestry, from a family that has been in New Hampshire since the colonial era.  His earliest American ancestor was 17th century immigrant Francis Matthews, who sailed from Devonshire, England.  Brown is part of a 9th generation New Hampshire family and was born on September 12, 1959 at the Portsmouth Naval Shipyard located on Seavey's Island in Kittery, Maine. Brown's father, Claude Bruce Brown, and mother, Judith Ann "Judi" (née Rugg), divorced when he was about a year old. When he was a young child, his mother moved with him to Wakefield, Massachusetts. He often spent his summers in Newburyport, Massachusetts, where his father served as a city councilor for 18 years. He also spent summers in Portsmouth, New Hampshire during his youth. His father and his grandfather were Republicans. His father has said that young Scott became interested in running for political office in the mid-1960s while accompanying him on a campaign for state office.

Brown had a difficult childhood; after her divorce, his working mother received welfare benefits. Brown experienced sexual abuse from a camp counselor who threatened to kill the 10-year-old boy if he told anyone – which he did not disclose, even to his family, until his autobiography Against All Odds (2011) – and physical abuse from his stepfathers. During various periods of his childhood, Brown lived with his grandparents and his aunt. He shoplifted many times, and was arrested for stealing record albums and brought before Judge Samuel Zoll in Salem, Massachusetts at the age of 13 or 14. Zoll asked Brown if his siblings would like seeing him play basketball in jail and required Brown to write a 1,500-word essay on that question as his punishment. Brown later said, "that was the last time I ever stole."

He graduated from Wakefield High School in 1977. He received a Bachelor of Arts in History, cum laude from Tufts University in 1981 and a Juris Doctor from Boston College Law School in 1985. During his undergraduate career at Tufts, Brown was a member of the Kappa chapter of Zeta Psi International Fraternity.

Early career (1978–1992)

Army National Guard service
Brown has said the rescue efforts of Army National Guard during the Northeastern United States blizzard of 1978 impressed him. When he was 19, he joined the Massachusetts Army National Guard, received his basic training at Fort Dix, New Jersey, and attended Reserve Officers' Training Corps (ROTC) classes at the campus of Northeastern University. He was trained in infantry, quartermaster, and airborne duties, and in 1994 he joined the Judge Advocate General's Corps (JAG). He was active in the Guard for 35 years rising to the rank of colonel. As the Army National Guard's head defense attorney in New England, Brown defended Guard members who had disciplinary difficulties such as positive drug tests, and provided estate planning and real estate advice to those who were about to deploy to war zones. He spent ten days to two weeks with the Guard in Kazakhstan and a week in Paraguay.

He was awarded the Army Commendation Medal for meritorious service in preparing for troops mobilization for Operation Noble Eagle (the mobilization of National Guard and U.S. Army Reserve personnel to provide security on military installations, airports, and other potential homeland targets) shortly after the September 11, 2001 attacks, and later for mobilization support for Operation Enduring Freedom and Operation Iraqi Freedom of the Iraq War. He credits his military experience with causing him to focus on veteran's issues as well as issues of war and peace. He has served on the Senate Committee on Veterans' Affairs, the Hidden Wounds of War Commission, and the Governor's Task Force on Returning Veterans during his career as a legislator.

On May 2, 2011, Brown announced that he would soon go to Afghanistan for training as part of his Army National Guard service. When deployed in August 2011 for a week of training, he spent most of his time in Kabul.

On August 1, 2012, Brown was promoted to Colonel in a private ceremony presided over by fellow senator John McCain. He officially retired from the Army on May 13, 2014, after 35 years of service, and was awarded the Legion of Merit.

Modeling
In June 1982, Brown, then a 22-year-old law student at Boston College, won Cosmopolitan magazine's "America's Sexiest Man" contest. After two weeks on a crash diet of "three cans of tuna a day" and intensive workouts he was featured in the magazine's centerfold, posing nude but strategically positioned so that according to Brown, "You don't see anything". In the accompanying interview, he referred to himself as "a bit of a patriot" and stated that he had political ambitions. The Cosmopolitan appearance and its $1,000 fee helped pay for law school, and began for Brown a "long, lucrative" part-time catalog and print modeling career in New York and Boston during the 1980s. Brown took a leave of absence from Boston College and further pursued his modeling career in New York where he was represented by Wilhelmina Models while taking classes at the Benjamin N. Cardozo School of Law.  He returned to Boston, after nearly two years, to continue his studies at Boston College and continued to work as a model represented by Boston agent, Maggie Trichon of Maggie Inc.

State political career (1992–2010)
Brown "caught the political bug" in 1992 when he was elected property assessor of Wrentham, Massachusetts. In 1995, he was elected to the Wrentham Board of Selectmen.

He successfully ran for the Massachusetts House of Representatives in 1998, representing the 9th Norfolk District for three terms. Brown again moved up the ladder of state politics to the state Senate in March 2004 when he won a special election to replace Democrat Cheryl Jacques. Brown was re-elected for a full term in November 2004, and again in November 2006, running without opposition the second time. He won re-election in November 2008, defeating Democratic candidate Sara Orozco by a 59–41 percent margin. Following his re-election, Brown was one of five Republicans in the 40-seat Massachusetts Senate. In the Massachusetts Senate, Brown served on committees dealing with consumer protection, professional licensing, education, election laws, public safety, and veterans' affairs.

In February 2007, a controversy arose after Brown's appearance at King Philip Regional High School in Wrentham, Massachusetts as part of a debate on gay marriage. The high school students had launched a Facebook group attack on Brown and had made a derogatory remark about his daughter, Ayla. During his presentation, Brown defended himself and his daughter by directly quoting several vulgar statements they had made and announcing the names of the students who had written the statements. Critics questioned whether Brown should have quoted the profane comments in front of a high school audience.

In January 2010, The Boston Globe reported that during six terms in the Legislature, three each in the House and Senate, Brown had a modest record of legislative initiatives, but he had carved out a niche as a leading advocate for veterans. Richard Tisei of Wakefield, Massachusetts, the leader of the Republican minority in the state Senate, called Brown "the acknowledged expert on veterans' issues". State Senator Jack Hart, a Democrat of South Boston, said: "He does his homework, he's comprehensive in his approach, and on veterans' issues, he's one of them and has done a very good job on their behalf."

Brown lists among his achievements as a legislator his authorship of a 2007 law that created a check-off box on state income tax forms for veterans to indicate whether they served in Iraq or Afghanistan. The state uses the information to notify veterans of available services and benefits, including the Welcome Home Bonus that provides $1,000 for those returning from active duty in Afghanistan or Iraq.

U.S. Senate (2010–2013)

2010 election

On September 12, 2009, Brown announced his run for the U.S. Senate seat that became vacant with the death of Ted Kennedy, saying the state "needs an independent thinker".  Washington Post columnist Kathleen Parker said that Brown's political positions did not fall neatly into party lines, and called Brown "mainstream in a nation that defines itself as mostly conservative". Boris Shor, political scientist at the Harris School of Public Policy, described Brown as a liberal Republican by national standards, but well-suited for his Massachusetts constituency. Shor explained the support Brown was receiving from the conservative national Republican Party as due to their "decentralized decision" to support the candidate most likely to win.

Brown won a landslide victory in the Republican primary on December 8, 2009, defeating late entrant and perennial candidate Jack E. Robinson by a margin of 89 percent to 11 percent.

Brown's opponents in the general election were Democratic nominee, Attorney General Martha Coakley, and independent Joseph L. Kennedy (no relation to the Kennedy family). At the outset, he faced overwhelming odds because he was relatively unknown compared to Coakley, he was running as a Republican in a very Democratic state, and much of his campaigning had to be done during the Christmas and New Year's season when citizens do not generally pay much attention to politics. No Republican had been elected to the U.S. Senate from Massachusetts since Edward Brooke in 1972. He polled far behind Coakley for several months, but closed the gap in the early weeks of January.

One week before the January special election, a controversy arose over a Coakley approved television ad.  The ad referenced the conscientious objector amendment Brown had sponsored for inclusion in a 2005 proposed state measure on patients' rights.  This amendment would have allowed individual healthcare workers and hospitals to refuse to provide emergency contraceptive care (the morning-after pill) to rape victims if they objected due to a religious belief. After the amendment failed, Brown did vote for the main bill which, along with other patient rights, requires healthcare workers and hospitals to provide such care. Coakley's ad featured a male voice that said, "Brown even favors letting hospitals deny emergency contraception to rape victims," over the ad's graphic which had the words, "Deny rape victims care". Brown's daughter Ayla called the Coakley ad "completely inaccurate and misleading", and stated that her father would never deny care to a rape victim.  Brown criticized Coakley for running what he described as attack ads.

In the 2010 Senate race, although Brown was not endorsed by the Greater Boston Tea Party group, the group organized a fund-raising breakfast for him in Boston. The Tea Party Express also endorsed Brown and bought ads on the national cable networks supporting Brown.

When told that at various times he has been labeled a conservative, moderate and a liberal Republican, he responded "I'm a Scott Brown Republican." According to Politifact, while Brown was a Massachusetts legislator, he voted about 90 percent with the state Republican leadership; however, Republican Leadership in the Massachusetts legislature is generally considered far more moderate than the national Republican Party.

A week before the general election, Brown raised $1.3 million from over 16,000 donors in a 24-hour moneybomb. His campaign office stated it raised $5 million over the period from January 11–15.  Charlie Cook of the Cook Political Report stated on January 17 that he would put his "finger on the scale" for Brown as the favorite. The Rothenberg Political Report released a statement that "the combination of public and private survey research and anecdotal information now strongly suggests that Republican Scott Brown will defeat Democrat Martha Coakley in tomorrow's race." Suffolk University's polling of three bellwether counties on January 18 had Brown leading Coakley by double-digit margins. Brown won the January 19 election, performing well in traditional Republican strongholds and holding rival Coakley's margins down in many Democratic precincts.

On election night, after Coakley conceded, Brown gave a victory speech that stated, "It all started with me, my truck, and a few dedicated volunteers. It ended with Air Force One making an emergency run to Logan. I didn't mind when President Obama came here and criticized me – that happens in campaigns. But when he criticized my truck, that's where I draw the line." Brown's upset win stunned the national Democratic party, and foreshadowed nationwide success for Republicans in 2010.

2012 election

October 2011 polling showed Brown's approvals had fallen and he faced a competitive re-election if matched against Democrat Elizabeth Warren. However, his numbers in early March 2012 showed he led Warren by 8 points in the polls. In March 2012, Brown's lead had narrowed to 2.3%, within the margin of error. As of September 2012, several polls showed Warren with a lead over Brown (with one still giving Brown an edge).

On November 6, 2012, Brown was defeated by Elizabeth Warren in the general election. Warren was able to garner 54% of the vote, while Brown won 46%.

2014 election

After much anticipation by the media, Brown announced that he would run for U.S. Senate seat in New Hampshire. Born at Portsmouth Naval Shipyard in Kittery, Maine, to parents who lived near downtown Portsmouth, Brown then spent his early childhood in Portsmouth, New Hampshire and later in Wakefield, Massachusetts following his parents' divorce. He has also been a taxpayer and owned a home in Rye, New Hampshire for more than two decades. In December 2013, he sold his primary home in Massachusetts and expressed to the Rye town clerk "his intention to establish residency and register to vote".

Polling done by various agencies in April and May 2014 showed incumbent Senator Jeanne Shaheen leading Brown by 3 to 5 points. A poll conducted in May by the Republican Governors Association showed Brown leading Jeanne Shaheen by 5 points. In late August, a WMUR/UNH poll showed Shaheen leading Brown by two points, 46 to 44. Polls were mixed in the final three weeks of the election, with most showing Shaheen ahead by 1–8 percentage points, and weekly polls by NH1 News, New England College, and Vox Populi showing Brown leading by 1–4 points.

There were five total debates during the election, three of which were televised. The televised U.S. Senate Debates were hosted by WMUR-TV, NECN, and NH1 News. The WMUR Debate was moderated by George Stephanopoulos of ABC and Josh McElveen of WMUR-TV and was held at Saint Anselm College in Goffstown. The NH1 News Debate was moderated by Wolf Blitzer of CNN and Paul Steinhauser of NH1 and was held at the NH1 Media Center in Concord. The NECN Debate was moderated by Chuck Todd of NBC and was held at the Capitol Center for the Arts in Concord.

Brown was defeated by Shaheen by a margin of 51.6% to 48.4%.

Tenure

Brown was sworn into office on February 4, 2010, by Vice President Joe Biden, in his capacity as President of the Senate, on the floor of the Senate.  As a Class I Senator, his term lasted until January 3, 2013.

Brown was among the speakers at the Conservative Political Action Conference (CPAC) in Washington, D.C., introducing former Massachusetts governor Mitt Romney. Despite his appearance at CPAC, where he alluded to his election as making "big government spenders ... [not] feel good at all", Brown refused to rule out a vote for a Democratic "jobs bill" proposal, and praised both Senate Majority Leader Harry Reid of Nevada and then-senior Senator John Kerry of Massachusetts for indicating their willingness to work with him across party lines. Brown was one of five Republican senators to vote for cloture on the jobs bill. The motion passed in the Senate 62–30 on February 22, 2010. In an up or down vote on the bill itself on February 24, 2010, Brown voted for final passage, helping to pass the bill 70–28.

According to The Washington Post, Brown voted with the majority of Republicans 80% of the time. In the same poll, "56% of Massachusetts voters believed he had kept his promise to be an independent voice in the U.S. Senate."

Brown's views on the 2011 budget cuts and his departures from Republican consensus placed him at odds with some of his fellow Republicans and prominent Tea Party conservatives, including Glenn Beck. He said he opposed these measures because he believed that they would have a negative impact on low income families and children.

In late June 2010, Brown was ranked as "the most popular officeholder in Massachusetts" according to a poll conducted by The Boston Globe.  55% of those polled had favorable opinions of Brown nearly five months after his January 19, 2010, special election victory to finish the term of the late Senator Edward Kennedy.  50% of respondents generally approved of how Brown had handled his new position.

On March 30, 2011, the Democratic Senate Campaign Committee released a poll showing that Brown remained the "most popular politician in the Commonwealth of Massachusetts, with an approval rating of 73 percent."  Brown's "'re-elect' score was comfortably above 50 percent, which is unusual for a Republican in an overwhelmingly Democratic state."

Committee assignments

Brown's committee assignments were as follows.
 Committee on Armed Services
 Subcommittee on Airland (Ranking Member)
 Subcommittee on Emerging Threats and Capabilities
 Subcommittee on Strategic Forces
 Committee on Homeland Security and Governmental Affairs
 Subcommittee on Disaster Recovery
 Subcommittee on Federal Financial Management, Government Information and International Security (Ranking Member)
 Subcommittee on Oversight of Government Management, the Federal Workforce, and the District of Columbia
 Committee on Small Business and Entrepreneurship
 Committee on Veterans' Affairs

Caucus memberships
 Senate Oceans Caucus

Private sector (2013–2017)
On February 13, 2013, Fox News Channel hired Brown as an on-air contributor. In February 2014, it was reported that Brown was no longer under contract with Fox News; however Brown's contract was renewed.

Following Brown's defeat in the 2012 U.S Senate race there was wide speculation that he would run again in 2013 due to John Kerry resigning from the other Massachusetts Senate seat to become Secretary of State. However, on February 1, 2013, he ruled out undertaking a third U.S. Senate campaign in less than four years.

In March 2013 Brown joined Nixon Peabody, a company which provides legal and lobbying services. Nixon Peabody reported that Brown would be working with the financial services and commercial real estate industries. In April 2014 Brown left the company. This work later received media attention when Lawrence Lessig with the Mayday PAC called Brown a lobbyist during the 2014 Senate election campaign. Brown's campaign denied the claim and said that Lessig had breached the honor code of Harvard University in making it.

While visiting the Iowa State Fair in August 2013, Brown stated he was considering a 2016 presidential run.

On August 21, 2013, Brown, during an interview on WBZ's NightSide With Dan Rea radio program, said he would not be a candidate for Massachusetts governor in 2014.

In September 2013, Brown joined the advisory board of Airtronic USA/Global Digital Solutions, a wireless communications and small arms manufacturer and exporter.

In early February 2014, Brown's email list was used to promote "a video from a doctor warning against flu vaccines, fluoridated water, and excessive exercising, among other questionable medical claims."  The email generated news coverage.  Brown subsequently cut ties with the vendor that sent the email.

On March 13, 2014, Brown began seeking campaign staff while aggressively courting New Hampshire's political elite, marking what local Republicans considered serious steps toward launching a Senate campaign against Democratic Senator Jeanne Shaheen.

On April 2, 2014, a local New Hampshire station reported that Brown "confirmed and announced on NH Today that he is running for the US Senate in NH" against Democratic Incumbent Jeanne Shaheen, and would announce the next week.

Post-2014 campaign

Brown had stated that win or lose in his 2014 New Hampshire Senatorial bid, he planned to remain a New Hampshire resident for the rest of his life. In January 2015, it was revealed that shortly after losing to Shaheen, Brown, age 55, filed an application to the Massachusetts State Retirement Board to claim a state pension. Brown did not rule out running for office again in the future. Brown is also working as a contributor for Fox News Channel and as an on-call host for Fox & Friends. Brown served as a featured speaker at the 2015 Republican Leadership Summit in Nashua, New Hampshire. Brown continues to play an active role in politics, campaigning and fundraising with senatorial and congressional candidates and meeting with Republican candidates for president in New Hampshire.

In 2015, Brown used his Facebook page to promote AdvoCare, a company that uses multi-level marketing to sell nutrition, weight-loss, energy, and sports performance products.  He said that he had lost 30 pounds in 24 days on the regimen.  He later added that neither he nor his wife were "paid spokesrepresentatives for Advocare," although he was confirmed as being an independent representative of the company. Citizens for Responsibility and Ethics in Washington has requested a Federal Trade Commission investigation of Brown's non-disclosure of financial interest in AdvoCare.

In February 2016, Brown became the first current or former U.S. Senator to endorse Donald Trump's presidential election bid. He introduced Trump to Anthony Scaramucci, who later briefly served as Trump's communications director.

In an August 2016 sexual harassment lawsuit against Fox News, Andrea Tantaros claimed that Brown made sexually suggestive comments to her and touched her without her consent. Brown denied the allegations.

Ambassador to New Zealand and Samoa (2017–2020)

On April 20, 2017, it was reported that Brown was nominated by President Donald Trump to be the next United States Ambassador to New Zealand and Samoa. He was confirmed by the Senate as Ambassador to New Zealand on June 8, 2017 and arrived in New Zealand on June 25. He was confirmed as Ambassador to Samoa a month later.

In October 2017, the U.S. State Department advised Brown to be more culturally sensitive after he called United States Peace Corps volunteers "beautiful" and told servers at an event that they could make good money in the food service industry. The State Department conducted a review and Brown was counseled on standards of conduct for government employees.

During the COVID-19 pandemic, Brown used a private jet to dodge the mandatory New Zealand quarantine. During this time, 112 other international diplomats used the government run quarantine facilities, which were temporarily housed in New Zealand hotels, to spend 14 days in monitored quarantine, but Brown's group of 6 did not.  Brown's flouting of the uniform quarantine – partly credited with keeping New Zealand mostly COVID-19 free – caused a furor as was made known after Brown had returned from a "working holiday" in the US.

Brown departed New Zealand on December 20, 2020, at the close of his term, leaving Kevin Covert as the chargé d'affaires.

Post-ambassadorship
In December 2020, Brown became the dean of New England Law Boston. He had been selected for this position in November 2019, with an initial agreement being made that he would assume the position in December 2020, at the end of his commitment with the State Department to serve as ambassador. He started his tenure as dean in January 2021. He resigned from this job in August 2021, with his resignation letter citing a difference of vision from that of the board of directors, and declaring that he would "re-engage in the political arena," by supporting, 
"candidates and causes who share my vision of re-building the Republican Party and moving our country beyond partisan gridlock."

In April 2022, it was reported that Brown would lead "The Competitiveness Coalition", a coalition formed in opposition to the proposed American Innovation and Choice Online Act (AICO). Organizations included in the coalition include the National Taxpayers Union, Americans for Prosperity, and the R Street Institute.

Political positions

Scott Brown is a moderate Republican. Brown describes himself as socially moderate and fiscally conservative. He said he is a "pro-choice moderate Republican." He said that he voted 50–50 with Democrats and Republicans and said he is bipartisan. He identifies himself as a "Reagan Republican". He has said, "I'm going to be the only person down there who is going to be the independent voter and thinker ... I've always been the underdog in one shape or form."

The University of Chicago's Boris Schor completed an analysis of his tenure in the state legislature and concluded that his voting record was more liberal than two-thirds of Massachusetts Republican state legislators. "He has supported abortion rights and come out against a constitutional amendment banning gay marriage – an issue he has said should be up to states to decide.

As a state legislator, he also supported Massachusetts' legislation to provide universal healthcare." However, in 2010, Brown was endorsed by the conservative Tea Party Express. After being elected, Brown said that "[he's] not a Tea Party member." As a United States Senator, Congressional Quarterly found that Brown voted with President Obama's 2011 positions on legislation 69.6% of the time. According to GovTrack, Brown was the third most moderate Republican Senator during his tenure in the Senate. He has a lifetime 53% conservative rating from the American Conservative Union and a 50% liberal rating from the Americans for Democratic Action. In 2012, the non-partisan National Journal gave him a rating of 54% conservative and 46% liberal.

Fiscal policy
Brown is a signer of Americans for Tax Reform's Taxpayer Protection Pledge. In a letter to the editor of The Boston Globe written on January 8, 2012, Brown wrote, "With out-of-control government spending and rising debt and deficits, politicians in Washington have proven time and time again that they cannot manage hard-earned taxpayer money responsibly. So why should we give them even more?"

Brown opposed a proposed multibillion-dollar tax on banks to recoup bailout money and prescribing of bank executive compensation. Brown, discussing the proposal through a spokesperson, said that he is "opposed to higher taxes, especially in the midst of a severe recession". He also opposed it on the grounds that the tax would likely be passed onto consumers in the form of higher service and ATM fees. In September 2010, Brown opposed a Senate bill creating a $30 billion government fund aimed at encouraging lending to small businesses. The bill combined the fund with $12 billion in new tax breaks. Brown criticized the bill for including a provision much like the Troubled Asset Relief Program, stating: "Banks making lending decisions with government funds is not the way to get our economy moving again."

On December 12, 2010, The Boston Globe reported that "[c]ampaign contributions to [Brown] from the financial industry spiked sharply during a critical three-week period last summer as the fate of the Wall Street regulatory overhaul hung in the balance and Brown used the leverage of his swing vote to win key concessions sought by firms." Brown received more than ten times the amount of contributions from the financial services industry as House Financial Services Committee chairman (and author of the legislation) Barney Frank during the same period. According to the Globe:

In December 2011, with a temporary payroll tax cut set to expire at the end of the month, the Senate considered the Middle Class Tax Cut Act of 2011, which would extend the tax cut for 113 million workers or families and fund the plan by a 3.25 percent surtax on incomes over $1 million.  Brown voted against proceeding to take up the bill (i.e., voted against cloture that would end the filibuster).  He announced that his opposition was to the surtax on high incomes.

Foreign policy
Brown supported President Barack Obama's decision to send 30,000 more troops to fight in Afghanistan. He cited Stanley McChrystal's recommendations as a reason for his support. He also advocates that suspected terrorists be tried in military tribunals and not civilian courts. He also supported the limited use of "enhanced interrogation techniques", including waterboarding against non-citizen terrorist suspects. He supports a two-state solution for the Israeli–Palestinian conflict in which Israel and a new, independent Palestinian state would co-exist side by side.

Veterans services
In 2007, Brown wrote a law establishing a check off box on State income tax forms to allow a filer to indicate if he or she is a veteran of the Iraq or Afghanistan wars. The measure's purpose is to locate and inform returning veterans of benefits they qualify for.  Known as the "Welcome Home" bonus, it was passed with bipartisan support.  Brown also amended the Dodd–Frank Wall Street Reform and Consumer Protection Act, with Senator Jack Reed (RI), to create a dedicated military liaison office within the newly formed Consumer Financial Protection Bureau, which aside from defending against unscrupulous lenders, also ensures protection of military families against fraudulent life insurance policies.  The measure passed the United States Senate 99 to 1.

Health care
Brown supported the 2006 Massachusetts health care reform, which requires all residents to have health insurance, with a state-subsidized plan created for those who cannot afford to insure themselves. Brown did not support President Obama's health care reform plan in the form approved.  He stated that the plan was fiscally unsound, and during his campaign he pledged to be the 41st vote to filibuster the bill in the Senate.

Brown voted for a state measure on patients' rights that, among other provisions, requires emergency rooms to provide what is known as the morning-after pill to rape victims to prevent an unwanted pregnancy from developing.  In consideration of health care workers who might have a religious objection to administering this medication, Brown attached what became known as the Conscientious Objector amendment which would have exempted these workers, as well as religious hospitals, from being required to provide this medication.  However, Brown's amendment also required that all hospitals still had to provide a means for the patient to receive the medication, either by providing another healthcare worker willing to administer the medication, or, in the case of religious hospitals, to provide transportation to another facility, and in a timely manner.  The amendment did not pass. Brown remains in favor of allowing religious hospitals to refuse to provide emergency contraception on moral or religious grounds, as he stated in the January 5, 2010 candidate debate.

Energy policy
Brown supports expanding solar, wind, and nuclear power, and offshore drilling exploration as a means to reduce the country's dependence on foreign oil. But, when faced with the controversial issue of whether an offshore wind farm should be allowed in the waters off the Cape Cod coast in Massachusetts, a major tourist destination and boating location, he expressed opposition, saying he believed it would hinder tourism and boating in the area.

Congressional ethics
Brown is an avid supporter of bipartisan cooperation among members of Congress. He has said that his goal in Congress is "to work in a bipartisan and bicameral manner." According to a Congressional Weekly study, in 2011 Brown was the second-most bipartisan U.S. Senator, voting with his own party only 54% of the time. By comparison, his partner in the Massachusetts Senate delegation, Senator John Kerry, voted with his own party 96% of the time, and the entire Massachusetts delegation to the House of Representatives voted with their party over 90% of the time. This centrism, though he was also sometimes described as libertarian in his ideology, had earned him criticism from the movement conservatives some of whom considered him a RINO or insufficiently conservative.

During the second half of 2011, Brown wrote the 2011 version of the STOCK Act, a move to ban insider trading in Congress. The act, which was co-written with Senator Kirsten Gillibrand (D-NY), would prohibit asset trading by members of Congress (and their staff) who have advance knowledge of their assets' behavior due to their involvement in Congress. The bill was verbally supported by President Barack Obama during his third State of the Union address, and passed a major procedural hurdle in the Senate by a vote of 93–2 on January 30, 2012.

Social issues

Abortion and reproductive issues
Brown has stated that Roe v. Wade is settled law and is self-described as "pro-choice" or pro-abortion rights. When the Republicans approved a stricter anti-abortion platform, Brown sent a letter to protest the decision calling it a "mistake". When he ran for the Senate in New Hampshire in 2014, his campaign said that "he is pro-choice and will protect a woman's right to choose." He is against intact dilation and evacuation abortions (known legally as "partial birth abortion") and has spoken in favor of parental consent for minors who seek an abortion. In 2005, Brown supported a 24-hour waiting requirement as well as one that women receive photographs of ultrasounds before an abortion. In 2002, he selected the statement "abortion should always be legally available" in a questionnaire. He said he would not use abortion as a litmus test in Supreme Court confirmations. He opposes federal funding for elective abortion in accordance with the Hyde Amendment. He supported funding for Planned Parenthood. In 2012, he supported the Shaheen Amendment to allow the military to provide abortions for servicewomen who were the victims of rape or incest.

As a state legislator and senator, Brown has mixed reviews from abortion rights and anti-abortion special interest groups. In 2000, he was given a 100% score from Planned Parenthood and a 0% score from Massachusetts Citizens for Life. In 2002, NARAL Pro-Choice Massachusetts gave him a 100% rating for supporting abortion rights positions. However, as a United States Senator, in 2011 he was rated 45% by NARAL Pro-Choice America and 75% by the anti-abortion group, National Right to Life.

Regarding other reproductive issues, Brown says that he supports a woman's ability to access contraception and use birth control, but he did vote against requiring businesses with religious objections to provide birth control. As a state legislator, he also supported stem-cell research voting for a bill that included embryonic stem-cell research in 2005. He authored legislation to fund research for stem cells from umbilical cords. In 2005, he broke with his party by voting with Democrats in support of a bill to allow embryonic stem cell research. However, he later opposed funding for embryonic stem-cell research.

Family law
Brown has supported a presumption of shared parenting after divorce and was a co-sponsor of Fathers and Families HB 1460.  He also voted for reauthorization of the Violence Against Women Act in 2012.

Immigration
Brown voted against the DREAM Act. He also opposed President Obama's executive order to decrease the deportation of undocumented immigrants. During his campaign for Senate, his platform included tighter regulation on immigration. Brown opposed bilingual education classes in Massachusetts schools; Brown did respond to a survey and said that most undocumented immigrants should be deported but that there should be some exceptions. In 2004, Brown voted to allow undocumented immigrants to receive in-state tuition, but later opposed it in 2014. 

As a US Senator in 2011, Scott Brown was the lead sponsor for a bipartisan resolution in Congress to apologize to Chinese Americans and Chinese immigrants for decades of discrimination, sinophobia, and violence, during the period from the Chinese Exclusion Act of 1882 through 1943 .  After the resolution passed unanimously, Brown noted to the LA Times that this "cannot undo the hurt caused by past discrimination against Chinese immigrants, but it is important that we acknowledge the wrongs that were committed many years ago". 

In 2012, Brown introduced legislation to give 10,500 employee visas to Irish immigrants. He argued that the Irish had fallen behind in the US immigration system. The Federation for American Immigration Reform, which seeks to reduce legal as well as illegal immigration, gave Brown a 100% rating in 2010 and Numbers USA, another PAC which seeks to restrict legal immigration, gave Brown an overall 32% rating.

Gun policy
Following the Sandy Hook Elementary School shooting in December 2012, Brown became the first Republican Senator to support a federal ban on assault weapons. During campaigning in September 2014, he said he would not propose new legislation if he returned to Congress and would listen to all viewpoints if others presented a bill.

In 2008, Brown had an A rating from the National Rife Association (NRA), but received a 43% score in 2012. In 2014, Gun Owners of America gave him a 30% grade and New Hampshire Firearms Coalition gave him a 14% rating; both groups are supportive of gun rights and oppose gun control.

Drug policy
After the Massachusetts Sensible Marijuana Policy Initiative was passed in 2008 and subsequently implemented, he proposed in the State Senate to enact higher fines for "drugged driving". In 2012, he opposed a state initiative to legalize the use of medicinal marijuana in Massachusetts. He also said efforts should be made to end drug trade in Afghanistan.

Same-sex marriage and LGBT rights
Brown voted for a 2004 state constitutional amendment to define marriage as between "one man and one woman" and which would have established civil unions. In 2007, Brown explained that he was opposed to gay marriage but also pointed "out that he does support civil unions for same-sex couples." Brown refers to the currently legalized same-sex marriage in New Hampshire and Massachusetts as a settled issue, which he does not wish to change. Brown has said he personally believes marriage is between a man and a woman, but would still oppose a constitutional amendment banning gay marriage. He is in favor of civil unions. He opposes ending the Defense of Marriage Act, but otherwise favors leaving the issue to the states to decide. After initially claiming neutrality on "don't ask, don't tell", the ban on openly gay military personnel, he joined a handful of Republicans who broke with their party to repeal the ban in December 2010. In 2012, he voted in favor of the Violence Against Women Reauthorization Act which included provisions to assist victims regardless of sexual orientation or gender identity and which prohibited its funds from being given to programs that discriminate on the basis of sexual orientation or gender identity. He was one of 15 Republicans in the Senate who voted in favor of the re-authorization.

When asked about same-sex marriage, he focused on the economy; "Brown said the economic challenges in regards to jobs, healthcare and college tuition affect both straight and gay couples and that is what he is working to address."  In 2012, his campaign said "Senator Brown is a supporter of civil unions, but believes that marriage is between a man and a woman. He believes that individual states are best positioned to decide whether to allow gay marriage, and he does not support a 'one size fits all' approach from the federal government."

He was endorsed by Log Cabin Republicans which supports same-sex marriage and other gay rights. The Log Cabin Republicans gave him their top award after he voted to repeal DADT. The Human Rights Campaign (HRC), an advocacy group which measures support for LGBT rights, has given Brown mixed ratings. In 2010, the HRC gave him a 33% score and in 2012 he was given a 55% score. The American Civil Liberties Union, which supports gay rights among other civil rights causes, gave Brown a rating of 50% in 2012.

Crime and security
Brown supports strengthening New Hampshire sex offender penalties, the death penalty, the right to bear arms (with some restrictions such as licenses and background checks) and strengthening border enforcement and creating an employment verification system with penalties for companies that hire illegal immigrants.

Intellectual property law
Brown opposed the PROTECT IP Act and the Stop Online Piracy Act.

Organizational associations and honors
Brown was a 35-year member of the Army National Guard, retiring as a colonel in the Judge Advocate General's Corps. Brown was awarded the Army Commendation Medal for meritorious service in organizing the National Guard to quickly support homeland security following the terrorist attacks of September 11, 2001. He has also completed Airborne School and been awarded the Meritorious Service Medal.

Brown has received the Public Servant of the Year Award from the United Chamber of Commerce for his leadership in reforming the state's sex offender laws and protecting victims' rights. Brown's family has helped raise funds for such non-profit organizations as Horace Mann Educational Associates (HMEA, Inc.), Wrentham Developmental Center, Charles River Arc, and the Arc of Northern Bristol County, all for the care and support of those with developmental disabilities. He has also been recognized by the National Federation of Independent Businesses (NFIB) for his work in creating an environment that encourages job growth and expansion in Massachusetts. The Boston Globe selected Brown as the 2010 Bostonian of the Year, citing his "profound impact on national politics in the last year".

Personal life
Brown is married to former NH1 News reporter Gail Huff, whom he met through modeling. They have two daughters, Ayla, an American Idol semi-finalist and 2010 graduate of Boston College, and Arianna, a competitive equestrian and 2012 graduate of Syracuse University. Arianna earned a Doctor of Veterinary Medicine degree from Cornell University in 2018 and is a practicing vet. Gail announced in September 2021 her candidacy in a run for New Hampshire's 1st congressional district in the 2022 election.

Besides their primary home in Rye, New Hampshire, the couple owns three rental condos in Boston, and a timeshare on the Caribbean island of Aruba.

Brown and his family are members of the Christian Reformed Church in North America. They also have a relationship with a Trappist community of Trappist nuns at Mount St. Mary's Abbey in Wrentham, Massachusetts. The Brown family has "assisted efforts to raise $5.5 million" to replace the abbey's candy factory with a new greener facility with solar panels and a wind turbine.

Brown plays guitar in his spare time, and as of February 2014 had appeared on stage multiple times with American power pop band Cheap Trick as a guest musician. Brown is currently playing guitar with his band "Scott Brown and the Diplomats."

Brown coached his local Rye, New Hampshire, junior high school boys basketball team in the 2015–16 and 2016–17 seasons before returning to the coaching in 2021.

References

External links
 
 
 
 
 2010 Campaign Website, archived October 16, 2014
  – Biographic profile of current activities in New Zealand

|-

|-

|-

|-

|-

|-

|-

|-

1959 births
Living people
20th-century American politicians
21st-century American politicians
21st-century American diplomats
Ambassadors of the United States to New Zealand
Ambassadors of the United States to Samoa
American military lawyers
American members of the Christian Reformed Church in North America
American people of English descent
Boston College Law School alumni
United States Army Judge Advocate General's Corps
Male models from Massachusetts
Massachusetts lawyers
Massachusetts National Guard personnel
Republican Party Massachusetts state senators
Republican Party members of the Massachusetts House of Representatives
National Guard (United States) colonels
New Hampshire Republicans
People from Kittery, Maine
People from Portsmouth, New Hampshire
People from Rye, New Hampshire
People from Wakefield, Massachusetts
People from Wrentham, Massachusetts
Recipients of the Legion of Merit
Republican Party United States senators from Massachusetts
Trump administration personnel
Tufts University School of Arts and Sciences alumni
Members of Congress who became lobbyists